Spirovo is a rural locality (a village) in Korotovskoye Rural Settlement, Cherepovetsky District, Vologda Oblast, Russia. The population was 17 as of 2002.

Geography 
Spirovo is located 53 km southwest of Cherepovets (the district's administrative centre) by road. Pesye is the nearest rural locality.

References 

Rural localities in Cherepovetsky District